Sainte-Lunaise is a former commune in the Cher department in central France. On 1 January 2019, it was merged into the commune Corquoy.

Population

See also
Communes of the Cher department

References

Former communes of Cher (department)
Populated places disestablished in 2019